ASA Tel Aviv WFC is a women's football club from Tel Aviv. The club is affiliated with Tel Aviv University and is part of the ASA Tel Aviv Sports Club. The club has won eight Ligat Nashim titles and five Israeli Women's Cup finals, and has participated in the UEFA Women's Champions League.

History
The club was among the first to be established in Israel, when the IFA set up the women's league. and is the only club to play in the 1st league since its beginning.

In its 24 seasons in the Israeli women's football league, the club has won eight championships and finished seven times as runners-up. By winning the league, the club qualified to the UEFA Women's Champions League, first appearing  in 2010–11. In eight attempts, the club has qualified once from the qualifying round, in 2011–12, eventually losing to Torres Calcio Femminile in the Round of 32.

In the Israeli Women's Cup, the club has appeared in eleven finals, losing in its first seven, including in six straight finals between 2004 and 2009. The club finally won its first cup in 2011 and added two more wins in 2012 and 2014.

Titles
 8  Israeli women's championships: 1999–2000, 2009–10, 2010–11, 2011–12, 2012–13, 2013–14, 2014–15, 2018-19
 5 Israeli Women's Cup winners: 2010–11, 2011–12, 2013–14, 2016-17, 2018-19

Current squad
 As of December 2021,https://www.football.org.il/team-details/?itemid=%7B2AE09DED-5019-4C49-BFD5-4458C66F9D24%7D&season_id=23&team_id=4222

Former internationals
  Israel:  Lia Barkai, Amit Cohen, Vered Cohen, Yifat Cohen, Mor Efraim, Shira Elinav, Lee Falkon, Moran Fridman, Sarah Lynn Friedman, Shelly Israel, Shahar Nakav, Shay Sade, Mairav Shamir

  Canada:  Nkem Ezurike
  Denmark:  Nina Frausing-Pedersen
United States women's national soccer team: Bella Bixby
Switzerland women's national football team: Rachel Rinast

European record

References

External links
Women's football team at UEFA.com
Agudat Sport University Tel Aviv

Women's football clubs in Israel
Association football clubs established in 1998
Football clubs in Tel Aviv